"Trouble" is a song by American alternative rock band Cage the Elephant, released as the second single from the band's fourth studio album Tell Me I'm Pretty on April 26, 2016. Produced and co-written by Dan Auerbach of the Black Keys, it topped the Billboard Alternative Songs chart in the United States, becoming the band's seventh overall chart-topper.

Background
Matt Shultz explained to ABC Radio that the song was inspired by a conversation he had with someone close to him. "We were both presenting ourselves as being very honest in the conversation. And I felt there were several places where I was holding back, or kind of curating the idea of what I wanted projected pretty heavily as inside the conversation. So I was curious at what level they were doing the same."

"So the song's kinda just about honesty and adversity and struggle and stuff like that," Shultz added.

Music video
The official music video for "Trouble" was released on April 21, 2016. The video combines the story of a western-style duel and its delusional results with shots of the band performing in the desert. It was filmed at the Joshua Tree National Park and it also marks Shultz' directorial debut.

Charts
The song was a hit on the Billboard Alternative Songs chart, peaking at number one and staying on the chart for a total of 51 weeks. It was also a hit on the Adult Alternative Songs chart, peaking at four and charting for 28 weeks. The song also charted on several other charts, mainly charting in North America.

Weekly charts

Year-end charts

Certifications

Release history

In media
This song plays during the final scene of Episode 10, Season 1 of the Netflix series The Lincoln Lawyer.
It also plays at the end of Episode 11, Season 1 of the series Bull and Episode 2, Season 1 of the series Santa Clarita Diet.

References

External links
 {{External music video|type=single|

2015 songs
2016 singles
Cage the Elephant songs
RCA Records singles
Song recordings produced by Dan Auerbach
Songs written by Matt Shultz (singer)